Nzema Solar Power Station is a  solar power plant, under construction in Ghana. When completed as expected in 2017, the power station will be the largest solar power installation on the African continent.

Location

Overview
The power station will use a total of 630,000 solar photo voltaic (PV) modules which, when struck by sunlight, will generate direct current (DC) electricity. Using inverters, the DC will be converted to alternating current (AC), which will be fed in the national electricity grid, to power an estimated 100,000 homes. When completed, it will raise Ghana's national electricity generating capacity by 6%.

Developers
The developer/owner of the power plant is Blue Energy Plc., a United Kingdom-based renewable energy developer. The company, has received regulatory approval from the Energy Commission and the Public Utilities Regulatory Commission, the two electricity regulators in Ghana. A generation licence  and a guaranteed feed-in tariff of US$0.20 per kWh for the plant's 20-year operational life have been secured. A power purchase agreement with the national electrical supplier ECG, has also been secured. Mere Power Nzema Limited, a special vehicle subsidiary of Blue Energy Plc., has been formed to develop, build, operate and own the power station. It has leased  near the village of Aiwiaso in the Western Region of Ghana for a period of 50 years to build the power station.

Costs, funding and timeline
Nzema is budgeted to cost approximately US$400 million. Blue Energy plans to source that capital from International financial institutions, multilateral lenders, equity partners and own capital. With a guaranteed purchase price of US$0.20 per kWh, the power plant is expected to break even in about 11 years. Construction is expected to be complete in October 2016.

See also

List of power stations in Ghana
Electricity sector in Ghana

References

External links

Solar power stations in Ghana
Western Region (Ghana)